Taifun may refer to:

Military and transportation
Taifun 9M15, a Soviet prototype anti-tank missile
Taifun, German WWII Thermobaric weapon system
Taifun (rocket), German anti-aircraft rocket system
Taifun (radar), Soviet system used in Sukhoi Su-15
Messerschmidt Taifun, a 1930s German aircraft (Bf 108)
Valentin Taifun, 1980s sailplane
Soviet trawler Taifun, also known as USS Penetrate (AM-271)
Taifun, 8m sailing boat in which Norway won gold in the 1912 Olympics
Wings of Change Taifun, an Austrian paraglider design

Film and music
Typhoon (1933 film), Original title Taifun

See also
Typhoon (disambiguation)